The Georgian Theatre is a Grade II listed theatre in Stockton-on-Tees, England and is one of the oldest Georgian provincial theatres in the country (cf Bath, Norwich and Wisbech). The oldest Georgian theatre in its original working form is the Theatre Royal in Richmond, Yorkshire.

The theatre has a capacity of 200 (standing) and is situated in the 'Cultural Quarter' of Stockton town centre, which is centred on Green Dragon Yard. It is gabled with pantiled roof and approached at the south end from a cobbled passage. There is a lean-to structure at the southern end, which is relatively modern. Adjoining is a cottage which was used as a drawing room, with actors entering the theatre through a door at the stage end of the east wall.

Built as Stockton's tithe barn, the building was converted to a theatre which opened from 1766 and began its new life as a touring house on the northern circuit, maintained by actors and stage managers. The theatre fell into disuse and disrepair some time during the 19th century and became a sweet factory until the late 1950s. More decline followed and the property was acquired by the local council in the 1960s before a refurbishment saw it re-opened as a community building in 1980. The building underwent a range of uses, operating more as an historic building than working venue, until 1993 when it was handed over to the Stockton Music & Arts Collective (part of the Tees Music Alliance since 2006).

A programme of capital works saw the theatre receive a much needed and long overdue makeover in 2007. Crumbling internal walls were given a new, clean finish, new toilets and dressing rooms were constructed, an efficient heating system was installed and a bright new bar area was created. The following year, the exterior of the venue, along with its neighbour Green Dragon Studios, underwent improvements to lighting and signage. The wider Green Dragon Yard and Theatre Yard areas also underwent environmental improvements, leading to greater leisure use of the area.

Today, The Georgian Theatre is managed and programmed by the Tees Music Alliance and can accommodate 200 people standing.  Its unpretentious interior provides an intimate setting for a variety of types of music and entertainment are provided including live bands, jazz, folk and plays. Previous, more famous performers include Arctic Monkeys, Mystery Jets, The Kooks, James Blunt, John Cooper Clarke, Duke Special, UK Subs, The Cribs, Sean Ryder, Clint Boon, Athlete, Jack Peñate, John Shuttleworth, Daisy Chainsaw, The Maccabees, The Charlatans, and The Chapman Family. The resident Tees Music Alliance features local artists heavily in its programme - promoting the creative engagement of local people.

The studio opposite the theatre can be booked for recording and rehearsal sessions and the facility is well used. The Tees Music Alliance also organises the Stockton Weekender - a large outdoor music festival taking place in the town each summer.

Image Gallery

References

External links
Tees Music Alliance
Stockton-on-Tees Borough Council
Stockton Weekender – the website of the Stockton Weekender (formerly Fringe Festival) music and comedy event. 

British Listed Buildings
British Listed Buildings (adjacent buildings)

Buildings and structures in Stockton-on-Tees
Theatres in County Durham
Grade II listed buildings in County Durham